George Vincent may refer to:
 George Vincent (MP) (1493c. –1566), member of parliament for Leicestershire Parliamentary constituency
 George Vincent (painter) (1796–1832), English painter
 George Edgar Vincent (1864–1941), American academic
 George R. Vincent (1841–1910), Wisconsin physician and legislator of the Greenback Party
 George Robert Vincent (1898–1985), sound recording pioneer
 George Frederick Vincent (1855–1928), English organist and composer